Weldon Brinton Heyburn (March 8, 1903 – February 7, 1979) was an American politician from Pennsylvania who served as a member of the Pennsylvania State Senate as a Democrat from 1937 to 1938 and then as a Republican from 1938 to 1949. He served as Pennsylvania State Auditor from 1949 to 1953 and as Pennsylvania State Treasurer from 1952 to 1957.

Early life and education
Heyburn was born in Concordville, Pennsylvania to Harry and Margaret (Darlington) Heyburn. He attended both public and private Quaker schools as well as the Maplewood Academy until age 15 when he completed his education at home.

After graduation, Heyburn joined his father's dairy farm business, H.H. Heyburn & Sons in Concordville, Pennsylvania.

Career
In 1936, Heyburn ran for Pennsylvania State Senate from Delaware County against the powerful incumbent Republican political boss, John J. McClure. Heyburn lost to McClure in the Republican primary by 17,000 votes, but Heyburn shocked the political establishment by running on the Democratic ticket and defeating McClure by 19,000 votes in the general election.

From 1937 to 1938, Heyburn caucused with the Democrats and served on the Senate Agriculture commission. In 1938, he re-aligned with the Republican caucus and served on the Labor and Industry, Finance, and Rules commissions. From 1947 to 1949, he served as president pro tempore of the Pennsylvania Senate. In 1949, he lost reelection to George Watkins.

Heyburn served as Pennsylvania Auditor General from 1949 to 1953 and as Pennsylvania State Treasurer from 1952 to 1957.

From 1949 to 1957, Heyburn served as Chair of the Delaware River Port Authority, president of the State Public School Building Association, secretary of the State Highway and Bridge Authority, as a member of the Brandywine Battlefield Park Commission and president of the American Association of Bridges, Tunnels and Turnpikes.

Heyburn served as board director, vice president and executive member of the Pennsylvania Motor Federation-AAA. In 1949, he became director and president of the Keystone Automobile Club of Philadelphia. He belonged to the Manufacturers and Bankers Club of Philadelphia and the Masons.

In 1967, he resigned from Heyburn & Sons and served as Delaware County representative to the Southeastern Pennsylvania Transportation Authority (SEPTA) until 1973.

He served as a member of the Board of Governor's Traffic and Transportation Council of Greater Philadelphia. He chaired the Delaware County Soil and Water Conservation District and was on the board of directors of the Suburban Loan Company.

Personal life
In 1936, Heyburn married Dorothy Schmidt and together they had two children.

Heyburn is interred at the Birmingham-Lafayette cemetery in Birmingham Township, Pennsylvania.

References

|-

|-

|-

1903 births
1979 deaths
20th-century American politicians
American Freemasons
Burials at Birmingham-Lafayette Cemetery
Dairy farmers
Farmers from Pennsylvania
Pennsylvania Auditors General
Democratic Party Pennsylvania state senators
Republican Party Pennsylvania state senators
People from Delaware County, Pennsylvania
Presidents pro tempore of the Pennsylvania Senate
State treasurers of Pennsylvania